Knokke-Zoute Airfield is a former airfield, located 5 km east of Knokke-Heist in West Flanders, Belgium. It was closed in 1960 and is now in agricultural use.

History
Originally constructed in 1929 between Knokke and the Zwin natural reserve. Initially serving civilian aviation, both by private pilots and airlines such as Sabena, it became a Belgian Air Force field by the late 1930s. At the outbreak of the German invasion of Belgium in May 1940, it was home to 6e Escadrille (Squadron) of 3rd Group flying Fairey Foxes tasked with firing exercises over the North Sea. The squadron was evacuated prior to the airfield being attacked by the German Luftwaffe on 10 May. The Belgian Air Force ordered the field destroyed before it was seized by the German Army on 18 May.

During the German occupation of Belgium it was used for the training of Anti-Aircraft FLAK units and aircraft hangars were constructed, however it was not used as a Luftwaffe airfield. It was attacked by the Royal Air Force in 1942, and in 1944 the airfield was ordered destroyed by the Germans. Trenches were dug to destroy the runways and the area was mined.

The area was liberated by Canadian Army forces in October 1944 and aviation engineers de-mined and constructed twin temporary runways on the airfield. It was designated Advanced Landing Ground B-83; it is not known which Allied units were stationed at the airfield.

After May 1945, it was abandoned by the military and turned over to the Belgian Government. It reverted to civilian use until 1960 when the facility was closed. The former airfield/airport has been dismantled and is now used for agriculture.

References
  Knokke-'t Zwin Airfield
 Johnson, David C. (1988), U.S. Army Air Forces Continental Airfields (ETO), D-Day to V-E Day; Research Division, USAF Historical Research Center, Maxwell AFB, Alabama.

External links
 Charts and photographs

Airports in West Flanders
1929 establishments in Belgium
1960 disestablishments in Belgium
Airports established in 1929
Belgian airbases
Defunct airports in Belgium
World War II airfields in Belgium
Knokke-Heist

de:Knokke-Heist#Flugplatz Knokke-Le Zoute